The Museum of Electrical Transport is located on Vasilyevsky Island in Saint Petersburg, Russia.

History
The museum was established in 1967, and is the oldest museum of electrical transport in Russia. It is based at the old Vasileostrovsky tram depot in Saint Petersburg which was built in 1906–1908. To celebrate the 90th anniversary of the St. Petersburg tram, examples of the trams that have been used in St. Petersburg have been restored. There are also static exhibits: archival documents and photos, cards, breadboard models of horsecars and trams, examples of tram worker uniforms, and original cash registers. On 21 May 2011, the museum took part in the Long Night of Museums event for the first time

Exhibits
The museum's collection includes 45 trams and 18 trolleys.

Redevelopment plans
There are plans to construct a "Palace of arts" and various commercial ventures on part of the museum's site. The project has caused mass protest from the local community.
All models of tramways and trolleybuses are available on the official site of the Centre of events in the Tramways of Saint Petersburg - event-tram.ru

See also
List of museums in Saint Petersburg

References

External links
 getmuseum.ru Official website of the museum
  Gorelektrotrans Official website of the city's (surface) electric transport administration Gorelektrotrans
  [(& ENG)http://www.event-tram.ru] Centre of events in the TRAMways
  - for Public Transportation, informal committee aiming preserving and developing tram traffic in favor of current minibus overdevelopment and private motorcar traffic, exceeding city streets capacity (Петербуржцы - за общественный транспорт)
  Saint Petersburg public transit photo gallery
  History, photos and much more about Petersburg tramways

Transport in Saint Petersburg
Railway museums in Russia
Petersburg
Transport museums in Saint Petersburg